is a Japanese manga series written and illustrated by Hiroshi Fukuda. It was serialized in Shogakukan's Shōnen Sunday Super from August 2009 to September 2010, with its chapters collected in three tankōbon volumes. A second series, Jōjū Senjin!! Mushibugyō, a retelling of the original series, was serialized in Weekly Shōnen Sunday from January 2011 to September 2017, with its chapters collected in thirty-two tankōbon volumes. 

A 26-episode anime television series adaptation produced by Seven Arcs Pictures was broadcast in Japan on TV Tokyo from April to September 2013, with three additional original video animations (OVAs) released in 2014 and 2015.

Plot
Mushibugyō is set in an alternate Edo period of Japan, where giant insects known as "Mushi" started appearing and attacking people 100 years before, and since then have brought terror and death to the country. To counter the threat of the Mushi, the Shogunate establishes the City Patrol who acts under the Mushi Magistrate (Mushi-bugyō) to assemble warriors strong enough to fight them. The story follows Jinbei Tsukishima, a young and cheerful samurai who is the newest member of the City Patrol answering a summon to his father by the Magistrate, but as he is not able to fight anymore, Jinbei takes the burden of protecting Edo from the Mushi in his place.

Characters

Mushibugyō

Jinbei Tsukishima

 is a young samurai and the newest member of the City Patrol. The son of a samurai who was forced to cut off his own leg in repentance for an incident involving Jinbei and the son of his master, despite not being his fault. When his father is summoned to join Mushibugyō, Jinbei departs for Edo to join the magistrate in his place to make up for his sacrifice and to help restore the honor of his family. Despite being far stronger than a normal human, Jinbei is the weakest member of the team, making up for his inexperience with determination and an unyielding spirit that ends up earning him the respect and admiration of his peers. In the last chapter of the manga it is revealed that Jinbei ended up marrying Kuroageha, Haru & Hibachi ending up with nine children.

Hibachi

 is a female ninja who specializes in the use of explosives, Hibachi's determined to prove her worth as the successor of her grandfather's techniques, despite the fact that he does not accept them being inherited by a woman. She admired Mugai greatly, but might have developed feelings for Jinbei too, as shown in Episode 15 where she showed hidden jealousy at the idea of him marrying Haru. She married Jinbei and together they had three children.

Mugai

 is the strongest warrior of the City Patrol, Mugai is a swordsman capable of feats that seem impossible for a human (fittingly, his name means "Limitless"). Mugai was once the leader of a group called the Mushigari (or the "Insects Hunters"), but for some reason he abandoned it to join the magistrate. Both Jinbei and Hibachi look up to him and dream of one day being as strong as him to repay the several occasions that he saved their lives. He seem to be emotionless and ruthless on the surface, but sometimes his actions show otherwise. His sword is as big as his whole body and has the ability to absorb insects and imitate their abilities.

Shungiku Koikawa

 is a man covered in scars known as the "Killer of 99". Koikawa is a convicted murderer who joins the City Patrol as an act of repentance. The son of a bandit, he tried to avoid a life of crime until his mother was murdered and (blaming his father for it) goes on a killing frenzy, slaying his entire gang as well as anyone else that got in his way, finally ending with him facing his father who begged him for mercy. At this moment, Koikawa learns that his mother died by the hands of a member of the Mushigari. Since then he has looked for his mother's killer and, after finally avenging her, Shungiku changes his title to the "Killer of 100".

Tenma Ichinotani

 is the youngest member of the team, Tenma is an onmyōji capable of summoning two powerful shikigami familiars contained in paper dolls that can enlarge themselves to giant size and deal powerful blows. He is afraid of many things, mostly crawling bugs but he has a strong will and always does his best and eventually got over his fear just a little.

Kotori Matsunohara

 is the commander of the City Patrol who answers directly to the Magistrate herself. His skills and abilities are a mystery until he uses them on a member of the Mushigari, who is found killed by a sword blow, which also cut the stone behind him. He does not often go into the field with the patrol, but he must be very skilled to be its commander.

Edo Residents

Haru

 is a beautiful and busty young lady whose family owns a restaurant. She is the first person who greets Jinbei when he arrives in Edo and ever since he saved her life, she has held affection for him. Later on in the series she married Jinbei and they had three children.

Nagatomimaru

 is a handsome, masked bookworm who lost his faith in people and dedicated his life to the pursuit of knowledge. He befriends Jinbei after his failed attempt to infiltrate the Magistrate to have access to its documents as he seems to be the only person who respects his wisdom. He is actually Ieshige Tokugawa, the son of the Shogun and the first in the line of succession, a fact that is kept a secret from Jinbei and almost everyone else.

Insect Magistrate

Kuroageha

 is the mysterious Magistrate of the Mushibugyō, whose body can produce a deadly poison capable of killing any living being who touches her skin. When using her powers to the fullest, she manifests giant butterfly-like wings, hence her alias of "black butterfly". She is the main enemy of the Mushigari, who seeks to kill her at all costs. Jinbei befriends her unaware of her true identity and she eventually develops feelings for him. Later on in the series she became one of Jinbei's wives, together they had three children.

Samurai House Patrol

Ogami Kagetada

Yagyuu Gieri

Shrines and Temples Patrol

Senokawa Isshin

Ogami Kagetada

Eight-Providence Patrol

Inukata Juuza

Chiyomaru

Imperial Court Patrol

Tsuchimikado Hinahime

Mushikari

Uro

Mitsuki

Gaikotsu

Manako

Kuroganemaru

Sougan

Mashiro

Kaina

Shidou

Bugmen
The Bugmen are the main antagonists of the series.

The Eternal Bug

Sanada Yukimura
Sanada Yukimura is a bugman who was one of the Five Osaka Braves.

Mouri Katsunaga
Mouri Katsunaga is a bugman who was one of the Five Osaka Braves.

Chousokabe Morichika
Chousokabe Morichika is a bugman who was one of the Five Osaka Braves.

Gotou Matabee
Gotou Matabee is a bugman who was one of the Five Osaka Braves.

Akashi Takenori
Akashi Takenori is a bugman who was one of the Five Osaka Braves.

Other Characters

Genjuurou Tsukishima

Kanae

Media

Manga
Mushibugyō is written and illustrated by Hiroshi Fukuda. It was published in Shogakukan's Shōnen Sunday Super 's from August 25, 2009 to September 25, 2010. Three tankōbon volumes were released by Shogakukan between April 16, 2010 and January 18, 2011. 

A second series, a retelling of the original series, was serialized in Weekly Shōnen Sunday from January 4, 2011 to September 20, 2017. The 316 chapters were collected into thirty-two tankōbon volumes, released from June 17, 2011 to October 18, 2017.

Anime
.An anime television series was announced in January 2013. The series is directed by Takayuki Hamana and produced by Seven Arcs Pictures aired on TX Network stations from April 8, 2013, to September, 30 and ran for 26 episodes. The series was simulcast on Crunchyroll. Three additionals OVA episode were bundled with the 15th, 16th and 17th volumes of the manga on July 18, 2014, October 7, 2014 and January 16, 2015. Sentai Filmworks licensed the OVAs.

The series uses four pieces of theme music. The two opening themes are "Tomoyo" by Gagaga SP and "Denshin∞Unchained" by FREE Hebi&M, while the two ending themes are "Ichizu" by i☆Ris and "Through All Eternity" by ayami.

Episode list

Video game
Namco Bandai Games announced on June 19, 2013 that a video game adaptation of Mushibugyō is in development for the Nintendo 3DS. The game is an Action RPG featuring all of the mushibugyo members as a playable characters. The game was released in Japan on September 19, 2013.

References

External links
Manga official website at Shogakukan 
Manga official website at Web Sunday 
 
 

Action anime and manga
Anime series based on manga
Crunchyroll anime
Fantasy anime and manga
Samurai in anime and manga
Sentai Filmworks
Seven Arcs
Shogakukan manga
Shōnen manga
TV Tokyo original programming